This article presents the complete discography of The Voidz.

Studio albums

Singles

Music videos

References

Discographies of American artists
Voidz, The
Alternative rock discographies